Vladimir Igorevich Merkulov (born 9 June 1989) is a former Russian professional football player.

Club career
He played in the Russian Football National League for FC Luch-Energiya Vladivostok in 2009.

External links
 
 
 Career summary by sportbox.ru

1989 births
Living people
Russian footballers
Association football forwards
FC Luch Vladivostok players
FC Okean Nakhodka players